"New World" is a song by English band Strawbs written by Dave Cousins. The track first appeared on the Grave New World album.

Lyrical and musical content

The song is very much a companion piece of "The Hangman and the Papist" from the previous album From the Witchwood. It tells of conflict and divided families and, like the earlier song, was prompted by the troubles in Northern Ireland.

This is perhaps the first song from the band that could be described as progressive in instrumentation and arrangement, in particular the prominent mellotron brass and strings.

Release history

The song was released as a single in Japan instead of "Benedictus", which was relegated to the B-side.

Personnel

Dave Cousins – vocals, acoustic guitar
Tony Hooper – acoustic guitar
Blue Weaver – Mellotron
John Ford – bass guitar
Richard Hudson – drums

External links
Lyrics to "New World" at Strawbsweb official site

References

Sleeve notes to album CD 540 934-2 Grave New World (A&M 1998 Remastered)
"New World" on Strawbsweb

Strawbs songs
1972 songs
Songs written by Dave Cousins